Fröndenberg (Westphalian: Frönnenbiärg) is a town in the district of Unna, in North Rhine-Westphalia, Germany.

Geography
Fröndenberg is situated in the Ruhr valley, approx. 10 km south-east of the district capital Unna, near the Hönne.

Neighbouring places
 Unna
 Wickede
 Menden
 Schwerte
 Holzwickede

History 
The city as such is relatively new, it grew out of the reorganization in 1902 whereby the former independent villages Stift, Westick and village Froendenberg melted into the bigger village community of Fröndenberg. It obtained city status in 1952. The oldest record of the name `Frundeberg` is the papal document by Coelestin III from 1197.

The present day administrative infrastructure goes back to 1968 when the villages Altendorf, Ardey, Bausenhagen, Dellwig, Frohnhausen, Frömern, Langschede, Neimen, Ostbüren, Stentrop, Strickherdicke, the town of Warmen and the town of Fröndenberg were merged into one administrative unit. In 1969 the village Bentrop also became part of the Fröndenberg district.

Notable people 

 David Blacha (born 1990), football midfielder
 Franz-Josef Bode (born 1951), 1986–1991 Catholic pastor in St. Marien
 Ernst Wilhelm Hengstenberg (1802–1869), Protestant theologian and churchman
 Arthur Jonath (1909–1963), Olympic medalist in sprint running
 Thomas Lehn (born 1958), musician
 David Wilms (born 1963), television host

International relations

Fröndenberg is twinned with:
  Bruay-la-Buissière (Pas-de-Calais, France)
  Winschoten (Netherlands)
  Hartha (Germany)

References 

Sources
 History of Fröndenberg

External links 
 
 Official site 

Unna (district)